"In God's Hands" is a song by Canadian singer Nelly Furtado from her third studio album, Loose (2006). It was written and produced by Furtado and Rick Nowels. The song was first released 30 July 2007 as the album's fifth and final single in the United Kingdom and was later released in various formats across Europe in the fall of 2007. Furtado recorded a new version of the song as a duet with Australian-American country singer Keith Urban the following year, which was released to North America in April 2008.

"In God's Hands" achieved only moderate success, becoming her lowest-charting single from Loose in every European country in which it was promoted. Following the song's North American re-release in 2008, however, "In God's Hands" reached its peak at number 11 on the Canadian Hot 100, earning Furtado her second highest-charting single to date since the chart's inception in 2007, and also peaked at a career-high position of 15 on the Billboard Adult Contemporary chart.

Content 
A country/pop song, "In God's Hands" is inspired by Furtado's 2005 breakup with DJ Jasper Gahunia, the father of her daughter. According to Furtado, the song was, at the time of its recording, "as far as [she] was willing to go in terms of pop right now".

Lyrically, the song is about moving on and starting anew, with Furtado declaring in the chorus, "Our love's floating up in the sky in heaven/ Where it began, back in God's hands." Her vocal style on the song has been described as "pretty."

Furtado also recorded a Spanish version, titled "En las manos de Dios", which appears in a Spanish limited edition of Loose.

Re-recording 
In early 2008, Furtado re-recorded "In God's Hands" as a duet featuring Australian-American country music singer Keith Urban, who was reportedly Furtado's "first choice." On her rationale behind the selection, Furtado said, "I love country music. Keith Urban's voice is plaintive and sweet; he's a pure songsmith, with an extremely humble tone to his voice... He's right on the border of country, roots and pop. He really defies description, and those are my favorite kinds of artists."

Critical reception 
Sean Fennessey of Pitchfork criticized the songwriting on the chorus and wrote that, "If "Promiscuous" is one of the fiercest songs of lust in recent memory, "In God's Hands" is one of the limpest." Jonathan Keefe of Slant was more ambivalent, praising Furtado's vocals but maligning the song's inclusion on Loose. "While "In God's Hands" is one of the first times in her career that Furtado's voice could... be described as pretty," writes Keefe, "the song itself... simply doesn't fit with the first two-thirds of the album."

Commercial performance 
"In God's Hands" debuted and peaked at number 116 on the UK Singles Chart dated 11 August 2007. It was the first single of Furtado's career (that was promoted to the United Kingdom) to miss the top 100. Elsewhere in Europe, the song performed moderately well. It reached a peak position at number 53 in Austria, number 33 in Germany, number 20 in Italy, number 33 in the Netherlands, and number 58 in Sweden. "In God's Hands" also reached number 9 and number 22, respectively, on the Flanders and Wallonian Ultratip Bubbling Under charts.

The 2008 duet version of the song debuted at number 11 on the Canadian Hot 100 chart dated 3 May 2008 and was the week's highest debut. This tied it with "Say It Right" as Furtado's second highest-charting single to date in her native country since the creation of the Canadian Hot 100 chart in 2007. "In God's Hands" also reached number seven on the Digital Songs component chart dated 3 May 2008. The song spent a total of 16 weeks on the Canadian Hot 100. In the United States, "In God's Hands" entered the Billboard Adult Contemporary chart dated 26 April 2008 at number 25 and was the week's highest debut. On the chart dated 21 June 2008, the song rose to number 18, breaking out of a tie with "Say It Right" for Furtado's highest-charting adult contemporary single to date. It reached its peak at number 15 on the chart dated 26 July 2008.

Music video 
A music video for the song was shot on 9 May 2007 between 5 and 7 a.m. in Los Angeles, California and directed by Jesse Dylan. It features Furtado on a beach during both daytime and nighttime, singing the song while sitting on a tree stump, lying on the sand and holding a white sheet, which she lies under. Furtado is also shown walking on the shore, weeping and looking onto the ocean. The video is shot entirely in black and white. It was made available on Furtado's Vevo channel 12 February 2008.

Track listings 

 CD single and digital download (2-track)
 "In God's Hands" (Album) — 4:12
 "In God's Hands" (Live) — 4:46

 CD maxi single
 "In God's Hands" (album) — 4:12
 "In God's Hands" (live) — 4:46
 "I'm Like a Bird" (Live) — 5:51
 "In God's Hands" (video) — 4:09

 UK digital download
 "In God's Hands" (album version) — 4:12
 "In God's Hands" (video) — 4:10

 Digital download (3-track)
 "In God's Hands" (album) — 4:10
 "In God's Hands" (Loose: The Concert live) — 4:45
 "I'm Like a Bird" (Loose: The Concert live) — 5:51

 Digital download
 "In God's Hands" featuring Keith Urban — 4:33

Charts

Original version

Weekly charts

Year-end charts

Duet version

Weekly charts

Year end charts

Release history

References 

2000s ballads
2006 songs
2007 singles
2008 singles
Black-and-white music videos
Geffen Records singles
Keith Urban songs
Male–female vocal duets
Mosley Music Group singles
Nelly Furtado songs
Pop ballads
Song recordings produced by Rick Nowels
Songs written by Nelly Furtado
Songs written by Rick Nowels